Callier is a surname. Notable people with the surname include:

 Alex Callier (born 1972), Belgian musician
 Debbie Gary Callier (born 1948), American air show pilot
 Frances Callier (born 1969), American actress, producer, writer, and comedian
 Terry Callier (1945–2012), American guitarist and singer-songwriter